Zinc finger protein PLAG1 is a protein that in humans is encoded by the PLAG1 gene.

Function 

Pleomorphic adenoma gene 1 encodes a zinc finger protein with 2 putative nuclear localization signals.  PLAG1, which is developmentally regulated, has been shown to be consistently rearranged in pleomorphic adenomas of the salivary glands.  PLAG1 is activated by the reciprocal chromosomal translocations involving 8q12 in a subset of salivary gland pleomorphic adenomas.

Interactions 

PLAG1 has been shown to interact with Karyopherin alpha 2.

References

Further reading

External links 
 

Transcription factors